Philadelphia is an unincorporated community in Cass County, Illinois, United States. Philadelphia is located on Illinois Route 125, southeast of Virginia. Vernon Huber, the 36th Governor of American Samoa, was born in Philadelphia.

The community was named for Philadelphia, Pennsylvania.

References

Unincorporated communities in Cass County, Illinois
Unincorporated communities in Illinois